Sviatoshynskyi Raion (Sviatoshynskyi Raion) is an urban district in the city of Kyiv located at the western part of city. The district was created in 2001 after renaming the former Leningrad District. It borders four other districts in Kyiv such as Podilskyi District, Obolonskyi District, Solomianskyi District, Shevchenkivskyi District as well as Bucha Raion that administratively is part of Kyiv Oblast. It takes its name from the historical neighbourhood of Sviatoshyn, named for the 12th century Prince Mykola Sviatosha.

Historical neighborhoods

The raion includes number of neighborhoods: Sviatoshyn, Borshchahivka, Akademmistechko, Aviamistechko, Bilychi, Bratska Borshchahivka, Berkovets, Nyvky 4, Bilychi, Bilychi village, Novobilichi, Katerynivka, Akademgorodok,  Zhovtneve, Mykilska Borshchahivka, Pivdenna Borshchahivka, Mykhailivska Borshchahivka, Peremoha and Galagany.

Kyiv-Sviatoshyn Raion 

Historically the raion was referred to as Leningradskyi and was renamed on 27 April 2001 after one of its neighbourhoods that commemorate . Its length is over 12 km, with a total area of 65.75 hectares and includes 5 parks. The governing bodies of adjacent Kyiv-Sviatoshyn Raion of Kyiv Oblast, until it was abolished in 2020, were situated in the Sviatoshyn Raion of Kyiv as the former oblast raion was purely suburban and lacked a distinctive center settlement.

Demographics

Population of the district:

2001 - 315,410

2008 - 327,970

2020 - 342,544

Sports and health care
There are 5 adult and 5 children's polyclinics, a children's clinical hospital, a maternity hospital, 5 hospitals and dispensaries in the district. The residents of the district have at their disposal 5 stadiums, the Nauka sports complex, 4 children's sports schools, and numerous sports clubs. There is a sanatorium for war and labor veterans and a geriatric boarding house in the district.

The main sports center of the district is the TEMP Stadium Sports Complex (10A Generala Vitruka Street). Reconstruction of the complex began in 2017 at the initiative of the district authorities. As of June 2019, 4 additional fields have been built at the stadium.

In 2016–2018, 25 football fields with artificial turf systems were built in educational institutions in the district.

Enclave on territory of district
Sviatoshynskyi district is the only administrative-territorial unit of the capital of Ukraine, on the territory of which the village of Kotsiubynske is located, which is an enclave of the city of Irpin, Kyiv region.

See also 
 Subdivisions of Kyiv

References

External links 
 Brief history of the Obolon and Minskyi districts
  Sviatoshynskyi Raion administration website
  Святошин in Wiki-Encyclopedia Kyiv

 
Urban districts of Kyiv